Happy Birthday is a play written by Anita Loos. It opened on Broadway at the Broadhurst Theatre on October 31, 1946 and closed on March 13, 1948, after 564 performances. It starred Helen Hayes, for whom it was written. The story involves Addie, a mousy librarian who becomes enamoured of a handsome bank clerk, and her attempts to win him over. It was directed by Joshua Logan and featured a song written for the show, "I Haven't Got a Worry in the World", with music by Richard Rodgers and lyrics by Oscar Hammerstein II and James Livingston.
(Rodgers and Hammerstein also served as producers.)

It was filmed as a television special for Producers' Showcase with Betty Field as Addie and aired on the NBC network on June 2, 1956. 

Helen Hayes won the Tony Award, Best Actress in a Play and Lucinda Ballard won the Tony Award, Best Costume Design.

References

External links
Internet Broadway Database listing

1946 plays
Plays by Anita Loos
Broadway plays